Miletus chinensis, the common brownie, is a butterfly in the family Lycaenidae. It is found in South Asia (Indomalayan realm)

Subspecies
 M. c. chinensis (Yunnan to south-eastern China and Hainan)
 M. c. assamensis (Doherty, 1891) (Kumaon to Assam and Sikkim)
 M. c. learchus C. Felder & R. Felder, 1865 (Indo-China, Thailand, Burma, northern Malaya)
 M. c. longeana (de Nicéville, 1898) (Manipur, Burma) — Long's brownie

References

Butterflies described in 1862
Miletus (butterfly)